The Burntwood River is a river in northeast Manitoba, Canada between the Churchill River and the Nelson River. Outsiders may know it as the river that passes through Thompson, Manitoba.

History
Near its headwaters around Burntwood Lake, the Kississing Portage connects it to the Churchill River. The route was used by lighter Indian canoes to carry the rich Athabasca furs to Hudson Bay or, by going up the Nelson, to the posts on Lake Winnipeg. The route was not much used by voyageurs partly because there was more Pemmican further south. Just south of the Burntwood, the Grass River, which also ends at Split Lake, was a parallel canoe route. In 1790 the Hudson's Bay Company built Lake's House at the mouth of the Burntwood. In 1793 David Thompson (explorer) followed a large part of the Burntwood. In 1825–26 George Simpson (administrator) tried to use the Burntwood as a direct route from York Factory to the Pacific, but the experiment was abandoned. Today it forms part of the Churchill River Diversion. The Wuskwatim Dam and Generating Station west of Thompson were expected to be completed in 2012.

See also
List of rivers of Manitoba
 Bois-Brûlés

References

Rivers of Northern Manitoba
Tributaries of Hudson Bay